Corhampton is a village in Hampshire, England. It lies on the western bank of the River Meon. It forms a civil parish with Meonstoke which adjoins it on the eastern bank. It is in the civil parish of Corhampton and Meonstoke.

Archaeology
Bronze Age bowl barrows and "Celtic fields" and circular earthworks probably dating from the Iron Age have been found on Corhampton Down in the west of the parish.

Parish church

The Church of England parish church is Saxon and was built around 1020. The font is Norman and there are 13th-century wall paintings in the chancel and a tide dial on the south wall.

In the churchyard is an ancient yew with a 26 ft girth.

References

Sources

External links

Bridge churches: Corhampton
Corhampton & Meonstoke Parish Council
Corhampton Golf Club

Villages in Hampshire